Tireli may refer to:

Tireli, Mali, a village in Dogon County, Mali
Nansi Tireli  (born 1965), Croatian politician and entrepreneur